Qingyang railway station is a railway station in Xifeng District, Qingyang, Gansu, China. It is an intermediate stop on the Yinchuan–Xi'an high-speed railway and was opened with the line on 26 December 2020.

It will be the eastern terminus of the planned Pingliang–Qingyang railway.

References 

Railway stations in Gansu
Railway stations in China opened in 2020